The Chapel of Chupan is a small, historic Armenian church building in a mountain valley west of Jolfa near the Aras River in East Azerbaijan Province, Iran. It was built in the 16th century and rebuilt in 1836. It is part of Iran's "Armenian Monastic Ensemble" UNESCO World Heritage site listing.

References

Jolfa County
World Heritage Sites in Iran
Armenian churches in Iran
Buildings and structures in East Azerbaijan Province
Chapels in Iran